Fabio Roscioli (born 12 March 1953), known by his stage name Ryan Paris, is an Italian singer, songwriter, musician and actor who gained international popularity in 1983 for the worldwide hit single "Dolce Vita", written and produced by Pierluigi Giombini.

Career
"Dolce Vita" was released in the United Kingdom on the Carrere Records label, distributed by RCA and spent ten weeks in the UK Singles Chart, peaking at Number 5. The record peaked at Number 1 in France, Belgium, Netherlands, Denmark, Norway, Spain and peaked at Number 3 in Germany. Ryan Paris continued to release records in the mid-1980s and 1990s. In 2010 he made a comeback with a new song, "I Wanna Love You Once Again", which he wrote and composed, with production by Eddy Mi Ami. At the end of that year, Paris co-produced a remix of "Dolce Vita" which peaked at number 54 in the official French club chart.

In 2013, the song "Sensation of Love", written and produced by Paris, was released as a single by Bulgarian artist Miroslav Kostadinov, peaking at number 15 in the official Bulgarian CD chart. A new version of the song, with a more 1980s vibe, co-produced by Paris together with Eddy Mi Ami and sung in a duet with Valerie Flor, was released in March 2014.

Paris continues to record and produce songs; his most recent releases include the songs "You Are My Life", "Buonasera Dolce Vita" and "Love on Ice". In December 2017, Paris sang "Dolce Vita" in the Catalan language for the Fundació la Marato. This version was produced by Jordi Cubino (David Lyme) and was recorded as a charity single for the benefit of the foundation, with the proceeds being utilised for the study of several human illnesses.

Discography

Albums
 1984: Ryan Paris, RCA Italiana (released in Italy only)
 2002: The Best Of
 2000: I Successi
 2002: Best Of
 2004: Dolce Vita (Box mit 2 CDs)
 2004: Let’s Do It Together
 2004: Don’t Let Me Down

Singles

 1983: "Dolce Vita"
 1984: "Fall in Love"
 1984: "Paris on My Mind"
 1984: "Bluette"
 1985: "Harry’s Bar"
 1988: "Besoin d’amour"
 1989: "Dolce Vita" (Remix)
 1991: "Dolce Vita" / "Fall in Love"
 1992: "The Beat Goes On"
 1993: "Don’t Let Me Down"
 1994: "Mr. Jones"
 1995: "It’s My Life" (Gen 64 feat. Ryan Paris)
 1997: "Only for You" (Favilli feat. Ryan Paris)
 1999: "Dolce Vita ’99"
 2009: "Dolce Vita" (re-master)
 2010: "I Wanna Love You Once Again"
 2010: "In Love Again"
 2011: "Tiki–Tiki–Tiki"
 2012: "Parisienne Girl" (80’s Remix)
 2013: "Sensation of Love"
 2013: "Yo quiero amarte una vez mas"
 2015: "Together Again"
 2016: "It's My Life" (Remix by Eddy Mi Ami)
 2017: "Buonasera Dolce Vita" (feat. Mauro)
 2017: "Dolce vita la marato" (Jordi Cubino version) 
 2018: "Can Delight" (duet with George Aaron)

See also
 One-hit wonders in the UK

Citations

External links
 
 
 

1953 births
Living people
Musicians from Rome
Italian male singers
Italian Italo disco musicians
Italian male film actors
English-language singers from Italy
Carrere Records artists
RCA Records artists